Montréal International (MI) is an economic development agency that encourages investment in Greater Montreal.  MI claims that it helped attract $2.642 billion in foreign direct investments to Greater Montréal in 2019.

Mandates

Attract, retain and expand foreign direct investments

In 2013, Montréal International and it's partners helped 39 foreign subsidiaries set up or expand in Greater Montréal. This prospecting and support resulted in foreign direct investments of $1.28 billion – 86% more than in 2012 – and in 2,729 jobs created or maintained. European companies accounted for 83% of the investments facilitated by MI — a more than 25-point increase over 2012. Two countries in particular saw their share rise sharply: Sweden and Germany.

Attract, retain and expand international organizations

In addition to playing an active part in keeping the International Civil Aviation Organization (ICAO) in Montréal – when it was being courted by Qatar – Montréal International played a strategic role in 2013 in the expansion of Airports Council International (ACI), which represents more than 1,861 airports in 177 countries. MI also led 63 foreign prospecting missions and organized 36 targeted activities to support the growth of international organizations already established in Montréal.

In 2013, thirty companies took part in three recruiting missions in the US and Europe, and 186 skilled foreign workers were hired. Montréal International is also one of the few investment promotion agencies in the world that helps organizations manage international mobility.

In addition to promoting the economic strengths of the Québec metropolis, Montréal International identifies the region's primary attractiveness issues and makes recommendations to the various levels of government.

Activities

Montréal International offers a series of services:
 Strategic and operational advice
 Financial and tax programs
 International mobility
 Industry expertise
 Economic data
 Network access

References 

Investissements étrangers: Montréal s'en tire plutôt bien - La Presse (French only)
Il faut relever le niveau d'ambition - Dominique Anglade, PDG de Montréal International - Les Affaires (French only)
Les Montréalais - Magazine Montréal Centre-Ville (French only)
Anglade rêve à un Montréal incontournable - Le Devoir (French only)
GRAND MONTRÉAL, GRANDE AMBITION - Entrevue avec Dominique Anglade, présidente-directrice générale - Magazine Action Canada-France (French only)

External links 
 Montréal International website

Economic development organizations
Greater Montreal
Economy of Montreal